Peruc is a market town in Louny District in the Ústí nad Labem Region of the Czech Republic. It has about 2,300 inhabitants.

Administrative parts
Villages of Černochov, Hřivčice, Chrastín, Pátek, Radonice nad Ohří, Stradonice and Telce are administrative parts of Peruc.

Sights
The 1,000-year-old Oldřich Oak tree is located in Peruc.

Notable people
Bedřich Schnirch (1791–1868), engineer

References

External links

 

Market towns in the Czech Republic
Populated places in Louny District